Bethel AME Church of Crawfordsville is a historic African Methodist Episcopal church located at Crawfordsville, Montgomery County, Indiana. It was built in 1892, and is a one-story, gable fronted frame building on a brick foundation. It features a large round-arched window and two-story, square corner tower. Portions of the building are believed to date to 1847,  Also on the property is a contributing one-story, Queen Anne style cottage that served as the original parsonage.

It was listed on the National Register of Historic Places in 2001.

References

African Methodist Episcopal churches in Indiana
Churches on the National Register of Historic Places in Indiana
Churches completed in 1892
Houses completed in 1900
Queen Anne architecture in Indiana
Buildings and structures in Montgomery County, Indiana
National Register of Historic Places in Montgomery County, Indiana
Crawfordsville, Indiana